Robert Dewilder (born 6 March 1943) is French former football player and manager.

Playing career
Dewilder played as a midfielder for Boulogne, Sochaux, Monaco, Toulon, Quimper and Blois.

Coaching career
He managed Quimper, Blois, Limoges, Brest, Nancy, Mulhouse, Toulon, Valenciennes and Boulogne.

References

1943 births
Living people
French footballers
Quimper Kerfeunteun F.C. players
French football managers
US Boulogne players
FC Sochaux-Montbéliard players
AS Monaco FC players
SC Toulon players
Ligue 1 players
Ligue 2 players
Limoges FC managers
Stade Brestois 29 managers
AS Nancy Lorraine managers
FC Mulhouse managers
SC Toulon managers
Valenciennes FC managers
US Boulogne managers
Blois Football 41 players

Association football midfielders